A. W. Rabi Bernard is an Indian politician and was a member of the Parliament of India from Tamil Nadu. He represents Anna Dravida Munnetra Kazhagam party.
He has interviewed several international and national leaders and business tycoons and he was Professor, Visual Communication, Loyola College, Chennai.

Education
B.A. (Journalism and Mass Communication), M.A. (Communications) Educated at University of Santo Tomas, Philippines.

See also
 Rajya Sabha members from Tamil Nadu

References

Living people
All India Anna Dravida Munnetra Kazhagam politicians
1959 births

People from Salem district
Rajya Sabha members from Tamil Nadu
Academic staff of Loyola College, Chennai
University of Santo Tomas alumni
University of the Philippines Manila alumni